The Akşehir chub (Squalius recurvirostris) is a species of ray-finned fish in the family Cyprinidae. It is found in central Anatolia in Turkey.

References

Squalius
Fish described in 2011